The Or Zaruaa Synagogue, Nachlaot, Jerusalem-   was founded in 1926 (5687 Jewish Calendar) by Rabbi Amram Aburbeh for the Ma’araviim Jewish congregation in Jerusalem. It is located on 3 Shmuel Refaeli Street in the Nachalat Ahim neighbourhood in Jerusalem.

The synagogue was named Or Zaruaa after the Beth Midrash (study hall) that was held by Rabbi Shlomo Aburbeh, Rabbi Amram Aburbeh's father in his residence located in Avraham Azriel's court in the Old City of Jerusalem .

Building

Site 

The Or Zaruaa Synagogue is listed among the sites for historic preservation by the Jerusalem municipality. The preservation site number of the synagogue is 2638. On 19 February 1997, Judge V. Ziler, President of the Jerusalem District Court, ruled that the synagogue would be declared permanently "Hekdesh," or  consecrated.

Description 
The Or Zaruaa Synagogue is a 10 meters high, two-storied building situated on a hill, 799 meters above sea level, with an area of 258 square meters, in the Nachlaot neighborhood, located in the center of Jerusalem. The exterior walls are covered with Jerusalem stone, as mandated for all buildings in Jerusalem. The first floor was built to provide the Rabbi and leader of the community a home. Today this space is used as a kindergarten. The second floor is the synagogue itself. The synagogue is designed in a typical Spanish North-African style, where the seating for the men surrounds the Bimah (stage). The hall has a very high ceiling, and it includes a gallery section for the women (ezrat nashim). Tall windows are accentuated by massive stone frames, curved at the top. The window panes are decorated with paintings and ornaments.

History 
Rabbi Amram Aburbeh began the project of building a new Synagogue to accommodate the growing number of Ma’araviim Maghrebi Jewish families that were exiting the walls of the Old City of Jerusalem and settling in newer neighborhoods. He approached Don Yamin Ben Harroch, who headed the Jewish community in Melilla, Spain, and was known for his philanthropy. The project appealed to Ben Harroch, so he agreed to contribute funds to enable the construction.

On Tuesday, October 26, 1926, (18 Cheshvan 5687 Jewish calendar) the cornerstone laying ceremony for the Synagogue building took place in the Nachalat Ahim neighbourhood. At 3 pm the celebration started with the Beit Chinuch Ivrim (The Blind School) youth orchestra. Several leaders of the Jewish communities in Jerusalem were invited to be present. There were the Rabbis representing Sephardi Jews and Ashkenazi Jews. Among them were Rabbis Shmuel Azran, Harav Hanazir-Rabbi David Ha-Cohen, Harlap, Ovadia Hadaya, Shimon Ashriki, and Shmuel Allaluf. The speaker at the ceremony was Avraham Elmalih, a representative of the Ma’araviim committee. The first stone was placed by Rabbi Nissim Elishar, followed by the other guests. Amram Aburbeh insisted that only Jewish workers would be permitted to work on the building.

Rabbi Amram Aburbeh headed the Or Zaruaa synagogue since its inception in 1926 till 1951 when he was elected to be Chief Rabbi in Petah Tikva, Israel.

Activities 
The new synagogue was inaugurated in 1927. Amram Aburbeh, the official owner of the Synagogue, served as its Rabbi. For a few years he was a resident in an apartment designated for him and his family on the first floor of the building until he built a house nearby. The apartment then became the residence of Haim Kobi, the Gabai of the Synagogue, and his family for the next 40 years.
Or Zaruaa served as a Synagogue as well as a Beit Midrash, where lessons were taught. The Synagogue congregation participated for several years in Tzedakah, or charity activities, such as a donation in 1931 to the Misgav Ladach Jewish Hospital in Jerusalem.

Amram Aburbeh asked each member of Or Zaruaa Synagogue to donate and contribute even a small amount of coins to support the Misgav Ladach Hospital. Among the list of family names, it is evident that the members were of many origins (Yemenite, Eini family; the Tzdaka family from Aleppo, Syria; the Abulafia family from Gallipoli, Turkey; the Mizrachi from Iraq; Iran; Bukhara, Uzbekistan). Rabbi Amram Aburbeh was nominated the Chief Rabbi of the Nachlaot neighborhood in Jerusalem by the Chief Rabbi of Eretz Israel, Ha'Rishon Le-Tzion, Rabbi Ben-Zion Meir Hai Uziel.

Or Zaruaa Synagogue served as a voting locations during the elections in January 1931.

Connections to other synagogues 
Between 1925 and 1927 Yamin Ben Harroch also allocated money for the construction of another Synagogue in his home town of Melilla, Spain, where Enrique Nieto designed the building. This Synagogue was also named Or Zaruaa.

Both Or Zaruaa Synagogues also resemble each other in several aspects of their interior design, such as the high ceilings, the marble stone walls with engraved dedications, colored stained glass tall curved windows, the ladies gallery (ezrat nashim) design and the unique multiple illuminating chandeliers. The chandeliers, originally from Italy, are still present in both synagogues, although they are now electric. The chandeliers gave the name Or Zaruaa a special meaning since "Or" in Hebrew means "light".

Or Brit Kodesh, BRIT, the bilingual magazine of Moroccan Jews edited by Asher Knafo, published in 2016, volume 34 an article "Or Zaruaa - Jerusalem - Melilla, two synagogues" (pages 72-80). 
In 2011 the artist Hai Knafo was inspired by Or Zaruaa and dedicated a painting titled  "Starlight Sower".

Rabbi Amram Aburbeh continued his family tradition of building Synagogues, and founded in  the Sephardic Synagogue called Beit Avraham in Petah Tikva. In 1970 his son Ehud Avivi-Aburbeh was among the founders of the Synagogue   Beit HaKnesset HaKipah HaAl-Adati and Beit Midrash named Netivei-Am after Rabbi Amram Aburbeh opus, in Shechunah Hey neighbourhood in Beer-Sheva.

Gallery

See also
 Expansion of Jerusalem in the 19th century
 Netivei Am website

References

External links
Jewish Institute for the Blind, Jerusalem
Jerusalem hospital Misgav Ladach
Matilde Tagger Avotaynu book
Jerusalem city archives
Jerusalem city Archive website 
50 years commemoration event of Rabbi Amram Aburbeh at Or Zaruaa Synagogue Nachlat Ahim neighborhood, Jerusalem 

North African-Jewish culture in Israel
Orthodox synagogues in Israel
Sephardi Jewish culture in Jerusalem
Sephardi synagogues
Spanish-Jewish diaspora
Synagogues completed in 1927
Synagogues in Jerusalem